KJJZ (95.9 FM, "Kool 95.9") is a radio station licensed to Indian Wells, California and broadcasting to the greater Coachella Valley and the Morongo Basin of California. Owned by Marker Broadcasting, it broadcasts an oldies format.

History
The station first signed on as KAJR and aired an adult hits format as "95.9 Jack FM". The station was launched to give the Coachella Valley a Jack-FM branded station as (KCBS-FM) in Los Angeles, was about 100 miles (160 km) to the west, and could not be listened to in the Coachella Valley.

Three years later in 2010, the station rebranded as "95.9 The Oasis" and adapted a soft adult contemporary format. On August 15, 2016, KJJZ rebranded as "Kool 95.9". In March 2021, the station flipped to hot adult contemporary, maintaining the "Kool 95.9" branding and adding the syndicated Elvis Duran and the Morning Show and On Air with Ryan Seacrest.

On September 20, 2021, KJJZ tweaked their format from hot adult contemporary to Top 40/CHR, branded as "Hot 95.9".

On August 22, 2022, KJJZ changed their format from Top 40/CHR to 1960s-1970s oldies, branded as "Kool 95.9".

KJJZ-HD2
On January 28, 2018, KJJZ launched an alternative rock format on its HD2 subchannel, branded as "Alt 101.5". This was the first time the Palm Springs area had an alternative rock station since KMRJ abandoned the format in 2008.

KJJZ-HD4
On August 26, 2022, KJJZ began broadcasting a dance format on its HD4 subchannel, branded as "NRG".  The HD4 channel was paired with FM translator K265FH in Cathedral City, which had been used to rebroadcast KPSF (1200 AM). The HD4 channel and 100.9 translator are independently programmed and operated by NRG Broadcasting, LLC.

References

External links

JJZ
Radio stations established in 2007
Oldies radio stations in the United States